The Mbum or Kebi-Benue languages (also known as Lakka in narrower scope) are a group of the Mbum–Day branch of the Adamawa languages, spoken in southern Chad, northwestern Central African Republic, northern Cameroon and eastern Nigeria. Their best-known member is Mbum; other languages in the group include Tupuri and Kare.

They were labeled "G6" in Joseph Greenberg's Adamawa language-family proposal.

Languages
Southern Mbum: Mbum proper, Mbere, Gbete
 South West Mbum : [Limbum of the Wimbum]
Central Mbum
Karang: Karang (Mbum, Laka), Nzakambay (Njak Mbai), Pana, Ngumi, Kare (Kãrɛ̃)
Koh: Kuo (Koh), Sakpu
Northern Mbum
Dama–Galke: Dama, Ndai (Galke, Pormi), Mono, Kali
Tupuri–Mambai: Mangbai, Mundang, Tupuri

In addition, Pondo, Gonge, Tale, Laka, Pam and To are unclassified within Mbum. To is a secret male initiation language of the Gbaya. Dek is purported in some sources but apparently unattested.

La'bi, an esoteric ritual language of male initiation among the Gbaya Kara, the Mbum, and some Sara Laka, is related to Mbum. It has substantial loans from one or more Sara languages. Other initiation languages in the Mbum family are To (Gbaya, but with partial Mbum origins), Dzel, and Ngarage.

See also
List of Proto-Lakka reconstructions (Wiktionary)

References

Roger Blench, 2004. List of Adamawa languages (ms)

External links
 A sociolinguistic survey of the Mambay language of Chad and Cameroon (PDF) by Cameron Hamm, 2002. SIL Electronic Survey Reports SILESR 2002–039.

 
Mbum–Day languages